On July 7, 2017, an Airbus A320-211 operating as Air Canada Flight 759 was nearly involved in an accident at San Francisco International Airport in San Mateo County, California, United States. The flight, which originated at Toronto Pearson International Airport, had been cleared by air traffic control  to land on runway 28R and was on final approach to land on that runway; however, instead of lining up with the runway, the aircraft had lined up with the parallel taxiway, on which four fully loaded and fueled passenger airplanes were stopped awaiting takeoff clearance. The flight crew initiated a go-around prior to landing, after which it landed without further incident. The aircraft on the taxiway departed for their intended destinations without further incident.

The NTSB determined the probable cause was the Air Canada flight crew's confusion of the runway with the parallel taxiway, with contributing causes including the crew's failure to use the instrument landing system (ILS), as well as pilot fatigue. A retired pilot stated the runway confusion that almost happened "probably came close to the greatest aviation disaster in history" as five airplanes and potentially over 1,000 passengers were at imminent risk.

Incident

At 11:46 p.m. local time, Air Canada Flight 759, carrying 135 passengers and 5 crew members, was cleared to land on Runway 28R. The adjacent Runway 28L had been closed at 10 p.m. local time and its lights were off, except for a  lighted flashing "X" at the eastern runway threshold. The captain was flying the aircraft and the first officer was monitoring. The two pilots of AC759 acknowledged that they mistook runway 28R for 28L and therefore lined up for landing on the parallel taxiway C, even though runways and taxiways are lit with different colors and intensities.  Preliminary post-event investigation results noted that Runway 28R and Taxiway C were lit on default settings (in different colors), and the automatic terminal information service broadcast information was current and advised that 28L was closed and unlit. According to preliminary Transportation Board investigation results, as the weather was clear, the pilots of AC759 were not required to utilize the instrument landing system and relied instead on a visual approach, as typical for the prevailing conditions.

Taxiway C contained four airplanes, three from United Airlines and one from Philippine Airlines, queueing for takeoff. The AC759 pilots "did not recall seeing aircraft on Taxiway C, but something did not look right to them" according to a post-incident interview summary. The crew of Philippine Airlines 115 (PR115) turned on their landing lights to alert AC759 they were lined up on the taxiway. The pilot of United Airlines 1 (UA001), the first in line for takeoff, interrupted the radio traffic at 11:56:01 p.m. and asked "Where is this guy going? He's on the taxiway." The air traffic controller then ordered AC759 to abort the landing at 11:56:10 p.m. After AC759 acknowledged the go-around, the air traffic controller stated, "It looks like you were lined up for Charlie [Taxiway C] there." AC759 had already started to climb before the go-around order.

Afterwards, the pilot of UA001 radioed the tower saying, "Air Canada flew directly over us," and the air traffic controller responded, "Yeah, I saw that, guys." Following a reconstruction of events, one pilot not involved in the incident noted that had the crew waited five more seconds before pulling up, it would have collided with the third airplane (UAL 863) on the taxiway. There was also less than  separation between the bottom of the Air Canada aircraft and the tail of the Philippine Airlines A340.

SFO was the first airport in the United States to install an Airport Surface Surveillance Capability (ASSC) system, which should have alerted the tower of a potential conflict between runway and taxiway movements. AC759 disappeared from the local controller's ASSC display for twelve seconds, between 11:55:52 and 11:56:04 p.m. local time (from shortly after the AC759 pilot asked for confirmation that 28R was clear, to the time the UA001 pilot noted that AC759 was lined up for Taxiway C), as AC759 was too far off-course from 28R.

AC759 completed its go-around and landed without incident after the second approach. A single air traffic controller was monitoring ground and tower frequencies, which would typically be handled by two controllers.

Aircraft
The aircraft flying AC759 that night was C-FKCK, an Airbus A320-200. The aircraft was 24.5 years old on the day of the incident, first flying in December 1992.

Investigation
The incident was not considered reportable under current federal regulations, but former NTSB chairman Jim Hall called it "the most significant near-miss we've had in this decade" and urged the NTSB to re-evaluate those reporting requirements. The United States National Transportation Safety Board (NTSB) was informed of the incident on July 9, and took the lead on the investigation, with assistance from the Federal Aviation Administration (FAA). The Transportation Safety Board of Canada (TSB) served as a facilitator to convey information between Air Canada and the NTSB. TSB released preliminary information from Occurrence No. A17F0159 on July 11, 2017. NTSB assigned identification number DCA17IA148 to the incident.

Other pilots pointed out that some airlines require all aircraft to use the instrument landing system (ILS) regardless of weather or visibility, which would have led the crew to realize that they were not lined up with runway 28R. Dave Jones, then California Insurance Commissioner and a passenger on AC759, wrote a letter to Air Canada a week after the incident requesting their cooperation with the investigation.

Final stages

In a September 25, 2018, board meeting, the NTSB cited as probable cause the pilots mistaking taxiway C for runway 28R due to overlooking the closure of runway 28L in the NOTAM report. Contributing factors included not taking advantage of the ILS, which was not in use by the flight crew, in the flight management system (FMS) visual approach; and pilot fatigue.
The crew's body clock was at the Toronto 03:00 Eastern Time: the first officer had no significant rest for 12 h, and the captain for 19 h – he would not have been able to fly under US pilot fatigue rules.
Transport Canada planned to bring its pilot rest rules in line with international standards later in 2018. New regulations were announced in December 2018, closer to international standards but criticized as substandard by the Air Canada Pilots Association.

The Federal Aviation Administration (FAA) received six recommendations: identifying approaches requiring an unusual manual frequency input; displaying it noticeably on aeronautical charts; reviewing NOTAMs to prioritize and present relevant information; requiring aircraft landing in B or C airspace to alert pilots when not aligned with a runway; modifying airports to alert on collision risks and clearly showing closed runways, as construction lighting on 28L looked like ramp lighting.

Air Canada is simplifying its SFO approach charts and includes SFO-specific training in aircraft simulators, trains its staff to reduce expectation bias, and will retrofit new aircraft like the Airbus A220 and Boeing 737 Max with dual head-up displays to enhance situational awareness in low-visibility, high-risk approaches.

The NTSB published their final report in September 2018; five recommendations were made.

As the pilots were slow to report the incident, the airplane had made another flight and the cockpit voice recording was recorded over. The NTSB has stated that it wants faster incident reporting and considers recommending capturing the last 25 hours, an increase from two hours.

A former NTSB investigator observed deficiencies in the investigation, criticizing the board for avoiding introspection and indicating that it is more reactive than proactive.
The report faults Air Canada for reporting too late and erasing the voice record, but notes that the NTSB only requires notification when an aircraft lands or departs on a taxiway, or when a collision is avoided after a runway incursion, and neither happened.
It also dismisses a comparable taxiway mishap in Seattle-Tacoma by Alaska Airlines (Flight 27) in December 2015, still in the preliminary investigation stage (NTSB assigned identification number DCA16IA036 to the incident).

The recommendation to improve the NOTAM system led to an ICAO initiative to reform it. Robert Sumwalt, Chairman of the NTSB, described NOTAMs as "a bunch of garbage that nobody pays any attention to".

Aftermath
Following the incident, in early August the Federal Aviation Administration modified nighttime landing procedures at SFO, forbidding visual approaches at night "when an adjacent parallel runway is closed" and replacing them with instrument approaches, either ILS or satellite-based, and requiring two air traffic controllers in the control tower "until the late-night arrival rush is over".

Air Canada stopped using flight number 759 for a time, but has since resumed its usage for its Montreal (YUL) to San Francisco (SFO) service.

See also
 Accidents and incidents involving the Airbus A320 family
Other near misses
 2001 Japan Airlines mid-air incident – another near miss that also avoided a high death toll.
 China Eastern Airlines Flight 5106 – a 2016 near collision upon takeoff after ignoring the control tower.
 Continental Airlines Flight 1883 – a similar incident in 2006 that involved an aircraft landing on a taxiway.
Notable runway collisions
 LAX runway collision: USAir Flight 1493 & SkyWest Flight 5569 (1991)
 Linate Airport runway collision: SAS Flight 686 & Air Evex Cessna Citation (2001)
 Tenerife airport disaster: KLM Flight 4805 & Pan Am Flight 1736 (1977)

References

Further reading

External links

 
 
 
 
 

Aviation accidents and incidents in the United States in 2017
Accidents and incidents involving the Airbus A320
Air Canada accidents and incidents
Airliner accidents and incidents in California
Airliner accidents and incidents caused by pilot error
History of the San Francisco Bay Area
2017 in California
July 2017 events in the United States
San Francisco International Airport